Mariamjvari Strict Nature Reserve is a protected area in Sagarejo Municipality, Kakheti region of Georgia on the southern slopes of Gombori Range.

History 
Mariamjvari Nature Reserve was founded in 1935 with the purpose of preserving untouched landscapes of relic Sosnowskyi pine (Pinus sosnowskyi).

Presently Mariamjvari Strict Nature Reserve is part of Georgia's Protected Areas which also includes Korugi Managed Reserve and Iori Managed Reserve.

Flora 
Most of the reserve landscape is covered with forest. Relict Sosnovskyi pine of Caucasus is spread at 800–1800 m above sea level. It is represented by variety of forms due to tree polymorphism :  pyramidal (Pinus Sosnowsky Nakai var. Pyramidalis Kurd.), compact (Pinus Sosnowsky Nakai var. Compacta Kurd.), oval (Pinus Sosnowsky Nakai var. Ovalus Kurd.), umbrella type (Pinus Sosnowsky Nakai var. umbraculifera Kurd.).
In protected forest there are also specimens of hornbeam,  oriental hornbeam (Carpinus orientalis),  oak, beech, maple, elm.  There are also many species of shrubs.

See also 
 Scots pine

References 

National parks of Georgia (country)
Protected areas established in 1935
Geography of Kakheti